Svenn Erik Kristiansen (born 30 May 1940) is a Norwegian teacher turned politician. He served as deputy mayor of Oslo for a period before becoming mayor of Oslo for a period in 2007, when Per Ditlev-Simonsen resigned. Following the 2007 Norwegian local elections, Kristiansen did not continue as mayor.

References
Biography 

1940 births
Living people
Progress Party (Norway) politicians
Mayors of Oslo